The Egyptian statue of Darius I is a statue of Achaemenid ruler Darius I with Egyptian iconography and inscriptions. This is the best known example of in-the-round statuary that has remained from the Achaemenid period. 

Darius I is depicted wearing a Persian dress, and armed with a dagger at his belt. The pleats of the right side of the robe are inscribed in Old Persian, Elamite and Babylonian cuneiform. The other side of the robe is inscribed with hieroglyphs. According to these inscriptions, the statue was made in Egypt at the request of Darius. This would have followed the Achaemenid conquest of Egypt.

The base of the statue is in Egyptian style. The front and back has a depiction of Hapi, the Egyptian god of the Nile.  The sides represent rows of vassals from numerous countries, with a total of twenty-four cartouches.

The statue was made in Egypt from grey granite, but was then transported to Susa, possibly by Xerxes I.

The statue is of grey granite that chemical analysis has indicated comes from the Wadi Hammamat in eastern Egypt. It was made in Egypt and later brought to Susa possibly in the reign of Xerxes.

Details

References

6th-century BC works
1972 archaeological discoveries
Archaeological discoveries in Iran
Darius the Great
Archaeology of the Achaemenid Empire
Susa
1972 in Iran